Prodelphinidin B3 is a prodelphinidin dimer found in food products such as barley and beer, in fruits and pod vegetables. It can also be found in pomegranate peels.

It can also be synthesized.

References

External links 
 Prodelphinidin B3 on www.phenol-explorer.eu

Condensed tannin dimers